'''Clitarchus may refer to:

Cleitarchus, a Greek historian active in the late 4th century BCE
Cleitarchus of Eretria, a Greek tyrant who lived in the 4th century BCE
Clitarchus (phasmid), a genus of insects in the family Phasmatidae